Tân Biên may refer to several places in Vietnam, including:

Tân Biên district, a district of Tây Ninh province
Tân Biên, Tây Ninh, a commune-level town of Tây Ninh province
Tân Biên, Biên Hòa, a ward of Biên Hòa